Hermann Ritter (16 September 1849 in Wismar – 25 January 1926 in Würzburg) was a German viola player, composer and music historian.

Biography
Hermann Ritter studied violin at the Neue Akademie für Musik in Berlin from 1865 to 1870.  His outstanding talent was soon recognized and was appointed music director of the municipal orchestra in Heidelberg, where he also continued his education at the University of Heidelberg.  During this time, his performance interest shifted from the violin to the viola, intent on improving the status of the violist by raising the standard of performance and developing an instrument with a tone equal to that of the violin and cello.

Besides musical compositions and transcriptions, Ritter is credited with writing many books and essays including several volumes on the music history of Europe.

Selected works

Original compositions
Stage
 Ein kritischer Tag, Familienscene in 1 act (1894)
 Durch Nacht zum Licht!, Schauspiel in 4 acts (1895)
 Ein Stein des Anstoßes, Abenteuer in 1 act (1895)
 Im Alpenglühen, Gebirgsstück mit Gesang und Tanz in 1 act (1903)

Vocal
 Altschottische Volksweisen mit Beibehaltung der Originalmelodien for voice and piano (published 1887); words by Robert Burns
 Fortgeflogen, fortgezogen for soprano or tenor and piano, Op. 20 (published c.1900)
 Schneeglöckchen for voice and piano, Op. 30 (published 1872); words by Fritz Holthey
 Leb' wohl! (Good-bye!) for voice and piano, Op. 59 (published 1893)
 Ich fühle deinen Odem for voice and piano, Op. 60 (published 1894)
 Lieder-Grüße aus Natur und Leben, 10 leichte und ansprechende Gesänge for voice and piano, Op. 62 (published 1894)

Piano
 Deutscher Sieges-Hymnus (German Victory Hymn), Op. 23 (1871)
 Trauergesang auf den Tod eines Kriegers (Lament on the Death of a Warrior), Op. 24

Pedagogical works
 Viola-Schule: für den Schul- und Selbstunterricht (Viola School; Méthode pour l'alto) (published 1884)
 Elementartechnik der Viola alta (Elementary Technique for the Viola alta) (published 1895)
 Solobuch für Viola (Viola alta, Altgeige), Heft I-II: Enthaltend die wichtigsten Soli der orchestralen Litteratur dieses Instrumentes (Orchestral Studies for Viola, Books I and II: Containing the Most Important Solos from the Orchestral Literature) (published 1910s)

Viola or viola alta
 Zwei Stücke (2 Pieces) for viola (viola alta) and piano, Op. 7 (1869)
     Idylle
     Elfengesang
 Schlummerlied (Lullaby) for viola (viola alta) and piano, Op. 9 (1871)
 Canzonetta in G major for viola (viola alta) and piano, Op. 10 (1875)
 Erinnerung an die Alpen (Souvenir of the Alps) for viola (viola alta) and piano, Op. 11 (published 1891)
 Jagdstück for viola (viola alta) and piano, Op. 17 (published 1883)
 Auf den Wellen (On the Waves) for viola (viola alta) and piano, Op. 27 (published 1878)
 Melodie for viola (viola alta) and piano (published 1878)
 Spinnerlied (Spinning Song) in B major for viola (viola alta) and piano, Op. 28 (published 1878)
 Zwei Stücke (2 Pieces) for viola (viola alta) and piano, Op. 32 (1886)
     Pastorale und Gavotte in A minor
     Im Traume in G major
 Nach slavischen Eindrücken (After Slavic Impressions) for viola (viola alta) and piano, Op. 33 (1886)
     Elegie in G minor
     Introduktion und Mazurka in A minor/C major
 Erinnerung an Schottland: Phantasie mit Benutzung altschottischer Weisen (Souvenir of Scotland: Fantasy on an Old Scottish Air) for viola (viola alta) and piano, Op. 34 (1886)
 Concert-Phantasie No.1 in C minor for viola (viola alta) and orchestra or piano, Op. 35 (1886)
 Concert-Phantasie No.2 in C major for viola (viola alta) and orchestra or piano, Op. 36 (1886)
 Italienische Suite (Italian Suite) for viola (viola alta) and orchestra or piano, Op. 37 (1886)
     Barcarole (Venezia)
     Elegie (Roma) in A minor
     Tarantella (Napoli)
 Zwei Stücke (2 Pieces) for viola (viola alta) and piano, Op. 48 (1889)
     Valse caprice
     Moto perpetuo
 Zwei Stücke (2 Pieces) for viola (viola alta) and piano, Op. 65 (1898)
     Andante
     Allegretto Scherzando
 Gesangsstück in D major for viola (viola alta) and piano, Op. 66 (1900)
 Ständchen (Serenade) in A minor for viola (viola alta) and piano, Op. 70 (published 1905)
 Rokoko: 2 Vortragsstücke (Rococo: 2 Concert Pieces) for viola (viola alta) and piano, Op. 73 (published 1907)
     Gavotte in C major
     Pastorale und Menuett in C major
 Dithyrambe in G minor for viola (viola alta) and piano, Op. 74 (published 1907)
 Melodia religiosa for viola (viola alta) and piano

Transcriptions
Transcriptions for viola or viola alta and piano unless otherwise noted
 Hermann Ritter's Repertorium für die Viola alta (Altgeige) mit Begleitung des Pianoforte (Hermann Ritter's Repertoire for the Viola alta and piano) (published 1878 by W. Schmid, Nürnberg)
     Aria di chiesa by Alessandro Stradella
     Largo in E minor by Jean-Marie Leclair
     Larghetto by Wolfgang Amadeus Mozart
     Moment musical by Franz Schubert; original for piano
     Lied ohne Worte by Felix Mendelssohn; original for piano
     Melodie by Hermann Ritter
     La Romanesca: Tanz aus dem XVI. Jahrhunderts
     Recitativ und Arie (aus Rinaldo) by George Frideric Handel
     Largo in F major by Johann Sebastian Bach
     Aria by Antonio Lotti
     Sonate in E-moll by Wolfgang Amadeus Mozart
     Ave verum by Wolfgang Amadeus Mozart
     Larghetto from the Violin Concerto by Ludwig van Beethoven
     Ave Maria by Franz Schubert
     Russisches Lied (Der Zweifel) by Mikhail Glinka; original for voice, chorus and piano
     Auf den Wellen by Hermann Ritter
     Gavotte (G-Dur) by Giovanni Battista Martini
     Romanze (Tregiorni) by Giovanni Battista Pergolesi
     Andante (F-Dur) by Wolfgang Amadeus Mozart
     Andantino (Es-Dur) by Wolfgang Amadeus Mozart
     Nocturne by John Field
     Arie (aus der D-Dur-Suite) by Johann Sebastian Bach
     La séparation: Nocturne (1839) by Mikhail Glinka; original for piano
     Chant sans paroles (Lied ohne Worte), Op. 2 No. 3 by Pyotr Ilyich Tchaikovsky
 Anthologie für Bratsche (Altgeige) mit Begleitung des Klaviers (Anthology for Viola or Viola alta and Piano), Book I: Works by Ludwig van Beethoven (published 1880s by C. Merseburger, Leipzig)
     Romanze, Op. 40; original for violin and orchestra
     Adelaide, Op. 46; original for voice and piano
     Romanze, Op. 50; original for violin and orchestra
 Anthologie für Bratsche (Altgeige) mit Begleitung des Pianoforte (Anthology for Viola or Viola alta and Piano), Book II (published 1880s by C. Merseburger, Leipzig)
     Larghetto from Sonate Concertante No. 4 in D major, Op. 115 (1809) by Louis Spohr; original for violin and harp
     Recitativ und Andante from the Violin Concerto No. 6, Op. 28 (1808–1809) by Louis Spohr; original for violin and orchestra
     Barcarole from 6 Salonstücke, Op. 135 No. 1 by Louis Spohr; original for violin and piano
     Erlkönig, Op. 1 by Franz Schubert
 Musik für Viola: Übertragungen von Hermann Ritter (Music for Viola: Transcriptions by Hermann Ritter); Nos. 1~3 (1884); Nos. 4~17 (1885); No. 20 (1891); Nos. 21~25 (1892); published by Friedrich Kistner, Leipzig
     Air varié, Op. 10 by Pierre Rode
     Élégie, Op. 10 by Heinrich Wilhelm Ernst; original for violin and piano
     Suite by Johann Sebastian Bach
        Sarabande (BWV 1012)
        Gavotte (BWV 811)
        Andante (BWV 1003)
        Allegro (BWV 1009)
     Notturno, Op. 9 No. 2 by Frédéric Chopin; original for piano
     Lied ohne Worte, Op. 53 No.2 by Felix Mendelssohn; original for piano
     Russische Melodie (Kosakentanz)
     Moto perpetuo by Niccolò Paganini; original for violin and piano
     Frühlingslied (Lied ohne Worte), Op. 62 No.6 by Felix Mendelssohn; original for piano
     Lied ohne Worte, Op. 85 No. 1 by Felix Mendelssohn; original for piano
     Adagio cantabile aus der Sonate pathétique, Op. 13 by Ludwig van Beethoven; original for piano
     Romance sans paroles in G major, Op. 23 (1875) by Karl Davydov; original for cello and piano
     Cavatine by Joachim Raff
     Wiegenlied, Op. 98 No. 2 by Franz Schubert
     Impromptu, Op. 90 No. 3 by Franz Schubert; original for piano
     Serenade aus dem Quartett No. 74 (Andante cantabile) by Joseph Haydn
     Notturno aus der Musik "Sommernachtstraum" by Felix Mendelssohn; original for orchestra
     Waltz, Op. 34 No. 2 by Frédéric Chopin; original for piano
     Adagio aus dem Klarinettenkonzert by Wolfgang Amadeus Mozart; original for clarinet and orchestra
     Aria in D minor by Francesco Durante
     Larghetto by Giuseppe Tartini
     Czárdás
     Lento, Movement I from a Sonata by Johann Sebastian Bach
     Siciliano by Johann Sebastian Bach
     Adagio by Johann Sebastian Bach
     4 altschottische Volkslieder (4 Old Scottish Folk Songs)
 Liebesgesang (Love Song), Notturno for viola (viola alta) and piano by Leopold Damrosch (published 1888)
 Albumblatt (Es-dur) for viola (viola alta) and piano by Richard Wagner (published 1890s); original for piano (1875)
 Bel canto: sechs Stücke von Meistern des XVII. und XVIII. Jahrhunderts (Bel Canto: 6 Pieces by Masters of the 17th and 18th Centuries) for viola alta (or violin) and piano or organ (published 1900)
     Arietta in G major by Alessandro Stradella
     Siciliana in G minor by Alessandro Scarlatti
     Vergin tutt'amor in D minor by L. Durante
     Aria "Caro mio ben" in D major by Giuseppe Giordani
     Adagio in E major by Johann Sebastian Bach
     Andante in A minor by George Frideric Handel
 Causerie for viola and piano (1900) by Alphonse Mailly (1833–1918); original for piano

Literary works
 Die Viola ihre Geschichte, ihre Bedeutung und die Principien ihres Baues (The Viola: Its History, Significance and the Principles of Its Structure) (1876)
 Die Geschichte der Viola alta und die Grundsätze ihres Baues (The History of the Viola alta, and the Principles of Its Structure) (1877)
 Repetitorium der Musikgeschichte nach Epochen übersichtlich dargelegt, nebst einem Verzeichnisse der hauptsächlichsten wissenschaftlichen Musikliteratur (1880)
 Über den Zweck des Studiums der Musikgeschichte (The Purpose of Music History Studies) (1880)
 Hermann Ritter und seine Viola alta (Hermann Ritter and His Viola alta) (1881)
 Aus der Harmonielehre meines Lebens: Kleine Skizzen und Aphorismen von Hermann Ritter (From the Harmony Teachings of My Life: Little Sketches and Aphorismen of Hermann Ritter) (1883)
 Die Viola alta oder Altgeige (The Viola alta or Altgeige) (1885)
 Populäre Elementartheorie der Musik für gebildete Musikfreunde (Popular Elementary Music Theory for Music Lovers) (1885)
 Die Aesthetik der Tonkunst in ihren wichtigsten Grundzügen (The Aesthetics of Music in Its Most Fundamental Features) (1886)
 Der dreifüßige oder Normal-Geigensteg erfunden und begründet von Hermann Ritter: Mit 50 Modell-Abbildungen (The Three-Footed or Normal Violin Bridge Invented and Founded by Hermann Ritter: With 50 Model Images) (1889)
 Musik in den Alpen (Music in the Alps) (1889)
 Katechismus der Musik-Aesthetik: Ein Hülfsbuch für den Musikunterricht in Schule und Haus (Catechism of the Music Aesthetic: a Guidebook for Music Lessons in School and Home) (1890)
 Richard Wagner als Erzieher. Ein Volksbuch und zugleich Begleiter zu den bayreuther Festspielen (Richard Wagner as an Educator. A Companion Book of the Bayreuth Festival) (1891)
 Über musikalische Erziehung: Ein Mahnruf an Eltern, Vormünder, Erzieher (On Music Education: A Warning Cry to Parents, Guardians, Educators) (1891)
 Studien und Skizzen aus Musik- und Kulturgeschichte, sowie Musikästhetik (Studies and Sketches of Musical and Cultural History and also Aesthetics of Music) (1892)
 Etwas weniger Musik! (A Little Less Music) (1896)
 Franz Schubert (Geb. 31. Januar 1797) Gedenkschrift zur 100. Geburtstagsfeier. Dem "Schubert-Bund" in Wien gewidmet (1896)
 Volksgesang in alter und neuer Zeit (Folk Song in Ancient and Modern Times) (1896)
 Haydn, Mozart, Beethoven. Ein Dreigestirn am Himmel deutscher Tonkunst (Haydn, Mozart, Beethoven. A Heavenly Triumvirate of German Musical Art) (1897)
 Die fünfsaitige Altgeige (Viola alta) : und die sich daran knüpfende eventuelle Weiterentwickelung der Streich-Instrumente (The Five-String Altgeige (Viola alta) and Further Development of Stringed Instruments) (1898)
 Einiges zum Verständniss von Berlioz' Haroldsinfonie und Berlioz' künstlerischer Bedeutung (Insight to Berlioz's Harold en Italie Symphony and Berlioz's Artistic Significance) (1899)
 Über die materielle und soziale Lage des Orchestermusikers: Ein Mahnruf an Eltern, Vormünder, Erzieher (On the Material and Social Situation of Orchestra Musicians: A Warning Cry to Parents, Guardians, Educators) (1901)
 Allgemeine illustrierte Encyklopädie der Musikgeschichte, 6 Bände (General Illustrated Encyclopedia of Music History, 6 Volumes) (1901–1902)
     Musikgeschichte des Altertums (A Music History of Antiquity) (1902)
     Musikgeschichte des Mittelalters (A Music History of the Middle Ages) (1902)
     Musikgeschichte Deutschlands im 16. – 18. Jahrhunderts (A Music History of Germany in the 16th through 18th Centuries) (1902)
     Musikgeschichte Deutschlands im 19. Jahrhunderts (A Music History of Germany in the 19th Century) (1902)
     Musikgeschichte Frankreichs, Britanniens, Russlands u.s.w. (A Music History of France, Britain, Russia, etc.) (1902)
     Musikgeschichte Italiens (A Music History of Italy) (1902)
 Das 19. Jahrhundert in seinen musikalischen Hauptvertretern in Deutschland (The 19th Century in Its Main Musical Representatives in Germany) (1902)
 Allgemeines über Streichinstrumente sowie Ideen über ein neues Streichquartett: Soprangeige (Violine), Altgeige (Viola alta), Tenorgeige (Viola tenore), Bassgeige (Viola bassa oder Violoncello): nach den Intentionen und dem Modell von Hermann Ritter (General Information about Strings and Ideas about a New String Quartet: Soprano Violin (Violin), Altgeige (Viola alta), Tenor Violin (Viola tenore), Bass Violin (Viola bassa or cello): According to the Intentions and the Model of Hermann Ritter) (1905)
 Erkenne Dich selbst!: Das goldene Buch der Lebensweisheit, 2 Bände (Know Thyself! The Golden Book of Life's Wisdom, 2 Volumes) (1905)
 Professor Hermann Ritter's Neues Streichquartett <Ritter-Quartett> (The Ritter Quartet: Professor Hermann Ritter's New String Quartet) (1910)
 Mein neues oder Reform-Streichquartett (My New or Reform String Quartet)
 Die Quellen zu Richard Wagner's "Der Ring des Nibelungen" (The Sources for Richard Wagner's "Der Ring des Nibelungen") (1911)
 "Franz Liszt" von James Huneker 1911 – Aufsatz von Hermann Ritter ("Franz Liszt" by James Huneker 1911 – Essay by Hermann Ritter) (1911)

Dedications
 Cyrill Kistler (1848–1907) – Serenade in D minor for violin, or viola (viola alta), or cello and orchestra, Op. 72 (1903)
 Franz Liszt (1811–1886) – Romance oubliée for viola and piano, S. 132 (1880)
 Hans Sitt (1850–1922) – 3 Fantasiestücke (3 Fantasy Pieces) for viola and piano, Op. 58 (1894)

References

External links
 
 Wagner Society of Dallas: Richard Wagner and the Ritter Viola
Musical Courier about an interview of Hermann Ritter by Richard Wagner

1849 births
1926 deaths
People from Wismar
People from the Grand Duchy of Mecklenburg-Schwerin
German classical violists
German composers
German music historians
German male non-fiction writers
19th-century German musicians